Feliciano Rey Álvarez (4 July 1894 - 4 March 1974), was a Spanish footballer who played as a midfielder for Racing de Madrid and Madrid FC. After retiring, he had a short spell at Deportivo Balompié as manager.

Playing career
Born in Madrid, he began his career at his hometown club Racing de Madrid in 1914, where he stood out for his goalscoring ability, which eventually drew the attention of Madrid FC, who signed him in 1917, and despite helping the club win the Centro Championships in 1917–18, and reach the 1918 Copa del Rey Final, starting in a 0-2 loss to Real Unión, Rey returned to Racing at the end of the 1917–18 season, where he finished his career.

Being a Racing de Madrid player, he was eligible to play for the Madrid national team and he was a member of the Madrid side that participated in the first edition of the Prince of Asturias Cup in 1915, an inter-regional competition organized by the RFEF. Rey was also a member of the Madrid team that won the 1918 Prince of Asturias Cup, which consisted of a two-legged final against Cantabric, and he scored the winning goal of the first leg in a 3–2 win, thus contributing decisively in the capital side's triumph.

Manegerial career
After retiring he became a manager, taking the helm of Deportivo Balompié in 1929, but his coaching career was short-lived as he left this position at the end of the 1929–30 season, and never again managed other side.

Honours

Club
Madrid FC
Centro Championship
Winners (2): 1917–18

Copa del Rey
Runner-up (1): 1918

International
Madrid
Prince of Asturias Cup:
Champions (1): 1918

References

1894 births
1974 deaths
Footballers from Madrid
Spanish footballers
Association football midfielders
Real Madrid CF players